The men's 69 kg weightlifting event was the third lightest men's event at the weightlifting competition, limiting competitors to a maximum of 69 kilograms of body mass. The whole competition took place on 6 October, but was divided in two parts due to the number of competitors. Group B weightlifters competed at 10:30, and Group A, at 18:30. This event was the fifth weightlifting event to conclude. The event took place at the Jawaharlal Nehru Stadium, Delhi.

Results

References

See also 
 2010 Commonwealth Games
 Weightlifting at the 2010 Commonwealth Games

Weightlifting at the 2010 Commonwealth Games